Elias Fredrik Pettersson (born 12 November 1998) is a Swedish professional ice hockey forward and alternate captain for the Vancouver Canucks of the National Hockey League (NHL). Pettersson was selected fifth overall by the Canucks in the 2017 NHL Entry Draft. Nicknamed "Petey" by Canucks fans, he was born in Sundsvall, Sweden, but grew up in Ånge, Sweden. After one of the greatest U20 seasons in SHL history in 2017–18 and winning the Le Mat Trophy with the Växjö Lakers, Pettersson made the Canucks opening night roster for the 2018–19 season. He won the Calder Memorial Trophy as the league's best rookie in 2019, becoming the second Canuck to do so after Pavel Bure in 1992.

Playing career

Sweden
Pettersson played hockey as a youth and made his professional debut with Timrå IK of the HockeyAllsvenskan. In his second season in Allsvenskan in 2016–17, Pettersson placed second on the team in scoring with 41 points in 43 games. Unable to help Timrå IK gain promotion, Pettersson signed a three-year contract with the Växjö Lakers of the top tier SHL, on 6 April 2017.

Pettersson was ranked second among European skaters by the NHL Central Scouting Bureau in his first year of eligibility for the 2017 NHL Entry Draft. He was selected as the first Swedish player taken in the draft, fifth overall, by the Vancouver Canucks, joining former linemate and Canucks prospect Jonathan Dahlén on 23 June 2017. It was speculated the Canucks drafted Pettersson based partly on highly successful chemistry with Dahlén on the top line for Timrå IK, where they finished fifth and ninth in league scoring as teenagers. The two scored on the first shift they ever played together in Sweden.

While still a junior player, Pettersson dominated the Swedish Hockey League in his 2017–18 rookie season. In 44 games played, he led the league in both points scored and in +/- at the end of the regular season, with 56 points (1.27 average) and +27 respectively. He also scored 24 goals, second in the league behind Frölunda's Victor Olofsson. In the penultimate game of the 2017–18 season, Pettersson recorded four points to reach 55 points for the season. In the season finale, Pettersson scored a goal to set a new record 56 for most points by a junior in a single SHL/Elitserien season, previously held by Kent Nilsson (set in 1975–76).

Pettersson went on to lead the playoffs in both goal-scoring, points, and +/-, with 10 goals, 19 points (1.46 average) and +17 respectively, in 13 games played. Scoring four game-winning goals, he led Växjö Lakers to the team's second Le Mat Trophy. Counting both the regular season and the playoffs, Pettersson scored 34 goals and 41 assists, for a total of 75 points in 57 games played (1.32 average). In April 2018, Pettersson was awarded the Stefan Liv Memorial Trophy, as the SHL playoffs' MVP, by SICO (Sweden's Ice hockey players Central Organisation). All 14 jury members voted unanimously for Pettersson, a first in the award's nine-year history. At the SHL Awards, Pettersson was named Rookie of the Year, and Forward of the Year.

Vancouver Canucks
On 25 May 2018, the Canucks signed Pettersson to a three-year entry-level contract. On 3 October 2018, Pettersson made his NHL debut against the Calgary Flames. Pettersson scored his first career goal against goaltender Mike Smith, and also recorded an assist in a 5–2 Canucks win. On 13 October 2018, during a game against the Florida Panthers, Pettersson suffered a head injury on a hit from Panthers defenceman Mike Matheson resulting in Pettersson leaving the game. Although Matheson was not penalized for the hit, the NHL Department of Player Safety believed that Matheson had an intent to injure, resulting in him being suspended two games and fined $52,419.36. Pettersson returned to the lineup on 27 October after missing six games; the Canucks lost 5–0 to the Pittsburgh Penguins. Two nights later, Pettersson scored two goals in a 5–2 win over the Minnesota Wild. On 1 November, Pettersson was named the October Rookie of the Month, and four days later was the Second Star of the Week. In December, he was named First Star of the Week on 10 December and after recording 17 points in 14 games during the month, he was again named Rookie of the Month. On 2 December 2019, Pettersson would win the hardest shot competition at the Canucks Skills Competition with a 99.4 mph slap shot. On 2 January 2019, Pettersson was named to his first NHL All-Star Game as the Canucks' lone representative. He notched his first NHL hat trick later that night in a 4–3 win over the Ottawa Senators, striking in the second and third periods before scoring the game-winning goal in overtime. Pettersson suffered a knee injury a night later when fellow rookie Jesperi Kotkaniemi appeared to hook him away from the play. Petterson went down clutching his right knee and play had to be halted by the referees but he was able to skate off under his own power. In his first game back from injury on 21 January 2019, Pettersson scored a goal and recorded an assist in a 3–2 win against the Detroit Red Wings. On 18 March, Pettersson earned an assist in a 3–2 overtime victory over the Chicago Blackhawks for his 61st point, surpassing the Canucks franchise record for points by a rookie which was previously held by Pavel Bure and Ivan Hlinka. In his rookie season, Pettersson totaled 28 goals and 38 assists, giving him 66 points in 71 games. After the season, Pettersson was named as a finalist for the Calder Memorial Trophy, an award he ultimately won at the 2019 NHL Awards in Las Vegas on 19 June 2019, becoming the second Canuck to do so after Pavel Bure.

Early in the 2019–20 season, Pettersson and Brock Boeser formed instant chemistry with off-season acquisition J. T. Miller. On 4 November 2019, Pettersson was named First Star of the Week after totaling 9 points over four games. On 30 December 2019, Pettersson was named to his second consecutive NHL All-Star Game to be played in a month, and was later joined by teammates Jacob Markstrom and Quinn Hughes. Notably, at the Hardest Shot Competition, despite Pettersson being the only forward and only player under 200 lbs in the contest, he'd achieve a 102.4 mph slap shot, the 2nd highest mark by a forward in the competition's history up until that point. On 12 March 2020, the Pettersson's season was cut short by the NHL's season suspension, meaning he was unable to surpass the 66 point mark of his rookie season, which he had matched in fewer games that season. When the season resumed on 1 August 2020, Pettersson would put up 7 goals and 11 assists for 18 points in 17 games as the Canucks would dispatch the Minnesota Wild and St. Louis Blues in 4 and 6 games, respectively, the team's first playoff series wins since 2011. They would make it as far as game 7 of the second round against the Pacific Division leading Vegas Golden Knights before bowing out. Pettersson's 18 points in his first playoffs were tied for the team-lead and the eighth highest scoring playoffs in Canucks playoff history.

Pettersson began the shortened 2020–21 season with the worst start of his career, posting just one goal and one assist in his first eight games, as the Canucks struggled out of the gate. However, Pettersson would find his game from then on, recording 19 points in his next 18 games, including five multi-point efforts. Unfortunately, Pettersson would sustain a serious upper-body injury on 2 March that sidelined him for the rest of the regular season.

On 1 October 2021, Pettersson signed a three-year, $22.05 million contract with the Canucks. On 22 December, in the Canucks' 6–5 shootout win against the Seattle Kraken, Pettersson recorded fourth NHL career five-point game, and passed Alexander Mogilny for most five-point games in Canucks history.

International play

Pettersson competed for Sweden in the 2018 World Junior Ice Hockey Championships, winning silver. Despite being limited to just five games, due to a broken thumb, Pettersson would go on to win a gold medal with Team Sweden at the 2018 IIHF World Championship.

On 9 May 2019, Pettersson was included to the roster to return for a second successive tournament with Sweden at the 2019 World Championships held in Bratislava, Slovakia.

Personal life
Pettersson's older brother, Emil, is currently playing for Timrå IK of the SHL. He was a sixth-round draft pick in the 2013 NHL Entry Draft by the Nashville Predators. Both brothers have played for Timrå and Växjö, with both having won SHL titles with Växjö; Elias in 2018, and Emil in 2021.

Growing up, his father was the Zamboni driver at the local rink, and because of this, Pettersson received much extra practice time.

Pettersson played soccer in the summer as a child in Sweden, and still is a fan of the sport.

Pettersson is of Finnish descent through his paternal grandfather, born Toivo Jokelainen, who was sent to Sweden in 1941 as a Finnish war child.

On 13 December 2011, Pettersson would hear that two of his best friends, Valerik and Davit Danielyan were deported from Sweden to Armenia. Along with some friends, a 13 year old Pettersson would be interviewed by a local newspaper and appear on television in support of the Danielyan family. With the support of the people of Ånge, his best friends would be permitted to return in March 2012 following 81 days in Armenia.

On 7 August 2019, Pettersson was named the cover athlete for the Swedish edition of EA Sports' ice hockey video game NHL 20.

Career statistics

Regular season and playoffs

International

Awards and honours

References

External links

 

1998 births
Living people
Calder Trophy winners
National Hockey League first-round draft picks
People from Krokom Municipality
People from Sundsvall
Sportspeople from Västernorrland County
Swedish expatriate ice hockey players in Canada
Swedish ice hockey forwards
Swedish people of Finnish descent
Timrå IK players
Vancouver Canucks draft picks
Vancouver Canucks players
Växjö Lakers players